Maurizio Antoninetti (October 7, 1956 – May 9, 2011) was an Italian-American man known for being the plaintiff in several lawsuits concerning accommodations for people with disabilities. Antonienetti filed suit against Chipotle Mexican Grill, Inc., claiming that the height of the counters at their restaurants blocked his view of the menu from his wheelchair, thus depriving him of the "Chipotle experience". A federal judge initially ruled against Antoninetti, saying Antoninetti had sued dozens of other places for access violations only to drop the suits after receiving cash settlements. However, the United States Court of Appeals for the Ninth Circuit ruled in favor of Antonietti, and ordered Chipotle to lower the height of their counters. Since immigrating to the United States in 1990, Antoninetti has filed lawsuits against over 20 businesses over service quality, only one of which he ever visited afterward.

References

See also
Americans with Disabilities Act of 1990
 ADA Compliance Kit
 American Disability rights movement
 Convention on the Rights of Persons with Disabilities

American people with disabilities
1956 births
2011 deaths